Jefferson Township is one of the thirteen townships of Clinton County, Ohio, United States. The 2010 census reported 1,399 people living in the township, 1,084 of whom lived in the unincorporated portions of the township.

Geography
Located in the southwestern part of the county, it borders the following townships:
Washington Township - north
Clark Township - east
Dodson Township, Highland County - southeast
Perry Township, Brown County - southwest
Marion Township - west

The entire township lies in the Virginia Military District.

The village of Midland is located in northwestern Jefferson Township.

Transportation
Major highways include U.S. Route 68 and State Routes 28 and 251.

Name and history
Named for President Thomas Jefferson, it is one of twenty-four Jefferson Townships statewide.  It was erected from Clark and Marion townships by the Clinton County Commissioners in 1839.

The charcoal kilns at Klocks Crossing were located along the B & O Railroad tracks outside Westboro.

Government
The township is governed by a three-member board of trustees, who are elected in November of odd-numbered years to a four-year term beginning on the following January 1. Two are elected in the year after the presidential election and one is elected in the year before it. There is also an elected township fiscal officer, who serves a four-year term beginning on April 1 of the year after the election, which is held in November of the year before the presidential election. Vacancies in the fiscal officership or on the board of trustees are filled by the remaining trustees.

References
Clinton County Historical Society.  Clinton County, Ohio, 1982.  Wilmington, Ohio:  The Society, 1982.
Ohio Atlas & Gazetteer.  6th ed. Yarmouth, Maine:  DeLorme, 2001.  
Ohio. Secretary of State.  The Ohio municipal and township roster, 2002-2003.  Columbus, Ohio:  The Secretary, 2003.

External links
County website

Townships in Clinton County, Ohio
1839 establishments in Ohio
Populated places established in 1839
Townships in Ohio